Bludenz (Alemannic: Bludaz) is a town in the westernmost Austrian state of Vorarlberg. It is the administrative seat of the Bludenz District, which encompasses about half of the Vorarlberg's territory.

Geography
The town is located on the Ill River, a direct tributary of the Rhine. It is surrounded by the ranges of the Bregenz Forest Mountains in the north, and by the Rätikon and Silvretta ranges in the south. Bludenz lies at the meeting point of five valleys: Walgau and Montafon (Ill), Brandnertal, Klostertal up to Arlberg Pass, and Großes Walsertal.

Bludenz is a popular starting point for hiking and mountain-biking in spring, summer, and autumn. It is located not far from many skiing resorts (e.g., Brand and Lech).

Major companies are Mondelēz International (Milka chocolate) and the Fohrenburg brewery which was established in 1881.

History
Archaeological finds indicate that settlement in the area of Bludenz began in the Bronze Age, and continued throughout the La Tène era. In 600 BC there was a Roman military training ground.

Bludenz itself was first mentioned in the year 830 CE in an urbarium of the Raetian estates within the Carolingian Empire. The town was established by the comital Werdenberg dynasty; town privileges were granted in 1274. A stay by the Habsburg Duke Frederick IV of Austria, who had just received an imperial ban at the Council of Constance, is documented from 30 March 1416. Four years later, Bludenz passed into the Further Austrian possessions of the Habsburg dynasty.

The Bludenz district headquarters are situated in the Castle of Gayenhofen, built in the 18th century.

Education 
High schools in Blundenz include Bundesgymnasium und Bundesrealgymnasium Bludenz.

Culture 
The Alpinale Short Film Festival was founded in 1985 in Bludenz. In August, around 40 international short films are shown to a crowd of 1,000 visitors. Related events are the Alpinale Ländle Tour, the Vorarlberger Short Film Night, and the Horror Short Film Night in autumn. The festival has taken place in Bludenz from 1985 to 2002, and from 2020 onwards. Between 2003 and 2019, it was held in Nenzing.

The Brewery Museum Fohrenburg displays the development of the Fohrenburg brewery and beer brewing in Bludenz in general. Historical photographs, old beer bottles and labels, earlier advertising motifs and equipment for beer production allow a look back at more than 130 years of Fohrenburg's brewing history.

The Bludenzer Tage zeitgemäßer Musik is an international contemporary music festival annually held in autumn/winter. Georg Friedrich Haas was the first artistic director, followed by Wolfram Schurig and Alexander Moosbrugger and the young Italian composer, Clara Iannotta, has been responsible for the program since 2014. Over the years, more than 100 world premieres have been performed in Bludenz.

Population

References

External links

 Bludenz official website

Cities and towns in Bludenz District
Vorarlberg